"Barcelona" is a Polish-language pop single performed by Pectus band. It was released on 23 November 2012, on the Siła braci album, by the Sony Music Entertainment Poland. It has been written and composed by the band vocalist, Tomasz Szczepaniak.

Reception 
It has been noted on the 1st place on AirPlay Największe skoki, 4th on AirPlay Nowości, and 46th on AirPlay Top 100 lists by Polish Society of the Phonographic Industry. On 8 June 2013, itt had been performed at the TOPtrendy 2013 festival in Sopot, Poland, at the Biggest Hits of the Year concert, which included the most played songs on the radio in Poland.

Charts

References 

2012 songs
2012 singles
Polish-language songs
Pop songs
Songs about cities